Idris Zubairu  is an Anglican bishop in Nigeria: he is the current Bishop of Bari, one of ten dioceses within the Anglican Province of Kaduna, itself one of 14 provinces within the Church of Nigeria.

His wife Saratu Zubairu was kidnapped and released a week later in March 2020.

Notes

Living people
Anglican bishops of Bari
21st-century Anglican bishops in Nigeria
Year of birth missing (living people)